Princess Margravine Albertina Frederica of Baden-Durlach (3 July 1682 – 22 December 1755) was a German princess. She was the daughter of Frederick VII, Margrave of Baden-Durlach and his wife Duchess Augusta Marie of Holstein-Gottorp. She married Christian August of Holstein-Gottorp, Prince of Eutin.

Biography 
On 2 September 1704, she married Christian August of Holstein-Gottorp, Prince of Eutin.

In 1726, her husband died, and her eldest son became monarch. One year later, he died childless and her youngest son, Adolf Frederick, ascended the throne. Adolf Frederick was a minor, but was allowed to govern "with his mother's support" and guidance. She also gave him her estates Stendorf, Mönch-Neversdorf and Lenzahn to provide him with an income.

Through her paternal grandmother, Countess Palatine Christina Magdalena of Zweibrücken, a sister of King Charles X of Sweden, Albertina Frederica descended from the Swedish royal house, which is why her son in 1743 could be elected as the heir to the Swedish throne.

Issue 
Hedwig Sophie Auguste (9 October 1705 – 4 October 1764), Abbess of Herford from 1750
Charles Augustus (26 November 1706 – 31 May 1727), engaged to Grand Duchess Elizabeth Petrovna of Russia
Frederica Amalia (12 January 1708 – 19 January 1782), a nun at Quedlinburg
Anne (3 February 1709 – 2 February 1758), who wed William, Duke of Saxe-Gotha
Adolf Frederick of Eutin (14 May 1710 – 12 April 1771), became crown prince of Sweden in 1743, and then ascended the throne as King of Sweden in 1751.
Frederick August of Eutin (20 September 1711 – 6 July 1785), Bishop of Lübeck after Adolf Frederick (who held it until going to Sweden), as well as the principality of Eutin. In 1773, Frederick August received the Duchy of Oldenburg and the county of Delmenhorst from his young cousin (Paul, Duke of Holstein-Gottorp (future Emperor of Russia), which would become the Grand Duchy of Oldenburg.
Johanna Elisabeth (24 October 1712 – 30 May 1760), wed Christian August, Prince of Anhalt-Zerbst, and mothered Catherine the Great, Empress regnant of Russia.
Wilhelm Christian (20 September 1716 – 26 June 1719)
Friedrich Conrad (12 March 1718 – 1719)
Georg Ludwig (16 March 1719 – 7 September 1763)

References

1682 births
1755 deaths
House of Zähringen
Daughters of monarchs